Mukuchyan is an Armenian surname.  Notable people with this surname may include:

Iveta Mukuchyan (born 1986), Armenian-German singer-songwriter
Marianna Mukuchyan (born 1984), Armenian-German make-up artist
Aida Mukuchyan (born 1987), Armenian artist

Armenian-language surnames